documenta 7 was the seventh edition of documenta, a quinquennial contemporary art exhibition. It was held between 19 June and 28 October 1982 in Kassel, West Germany. The artistic director was Rudi Fuchs.

Participants

References 

Documenta
1982 in Germany
1982 in art